Bir Ali Ben Khélifa is a town and commune in eastern Tunisia in the Sfax Governorate. It lies 60 kilometres from Sfax. As of 2004 the town had a population of 4460.

References

Populated places in Sfax Governorate
Communes of Tunisia